Nectandra debilis is a species of plant in the family Lauraceae.

It is endemic to Espírito Santo state and Rio de Janeiro (state) of Southeastern Brazil.

It is threatened by habitat loss.

References

debilis
Endemic flora of Brazil
Flora of Espírito Santo
Flora of Rio de Janeiro (state)
Critically endangered flora of South America
Taxonomy articles created by Polbot